John Daniel Morris (born February 23, 1961), is an American former professional baseball outfielder, who played seven seasons in Major League Baseball (MLB) for the St. Louis Cardinals, Philadelphia Phillies, and California Angels.

Amateur career
Morris attended Seton Hall University, where he played baseball for the Pirates under head coach Mike Sheppard. In 1981, Morris played collegiate summer baseball for the Wareham Gatemen of the Cape Cod Baseball League (CCBL). He batted .410 and set a league record for runs scored in a season. Morris was named the league's MVP, and was inducted into the CCBL Hall of Fame in 2007.

Professional career

Morris was drafted by the Kansas City Royals in the first round of the 1982 amateur draft. Morris won the  Southern League Most Valuable Player Award. He played in the Royals organization until May , when he was traded to the Cardinals for outfielder Lonnie Smith.

In , after coming back from surgery for a ruptured disc, Morris was limited to 38 at-bats, for the Cardinals.

In , while playing with the Philadelphia Phillies, Morris was mired in a 20-game hitless streak. Then, on September 1, he entered the game in the eighth inning, as a pinch-runner, scoring the tying run and remaining in the game, playing center field. When Morris led off the 10th inning, Atlanta Braves relief pitcher Mark Wohlers, hardly knew what hit him: Morris came through, hitting a game-winning walk-off home run, leading the Phillies to a 5-4 victory.

References

External links

John Morris at Baseball Almanac

1961 births
Living people
All-American college baseball players
American expatriate baseball players in Canada
Baseball players from New York (state)
California Angels players
Cincinnati Reds scouts
Edmonton Trappers players
Fort Myers Royals players
Jacksonville Suns players
Louisville Redbirds players
Major League Baseball outfielders
Omaha Royals players
People from Freeport, New York
Philadelphia Phillies players
St. Louis Cardinals players
Seton Hall Pirates baseball players
Wareham Gatemen players